Yrjö Welling (15 February 1885, in Kirvu – 2 March 1963) was a Finnish farmer and politician. He was a member of the Parliament of Finland from 1922 to 1951, representing the Social Democratic Party of Finland (SDP). During the Continuation War, Welling was among the signatories of the "Petition of the Thirty-three", which was presented to President Ryti by members of the Peace opposition on 20 August 1943.

References

1885 births
1963 deaths
People from Vyborg District
People from Viipuri Province (Grand Duchy of Finland)
Social Democratic Party of Finland politicians
Members of the Parliament of Finland (1922–24)
Members of the Parliament of Finland (1924–27)
Members of the Parliament of Finland (1927–29)
Members of the Parliament of Finland (1929–30)
Members of the Parliament of Finland (1930–33)
Members of the Parliament of Finland (1933–36)
Members of the Parliament of Finland (1936–39)
Members of the Parliament of Finland (1939–45)
Members of the Parliament of Finland (1945–48)
Members of the Parliament of Finland (1948–51)
Finnish people of World War II